The Gen. Cass and Belle Smith House, also known as the Smith-Jacobs House, is a historic dwelling located in Lake City, Iowa, United States.  G.C. Smith was born in Lake City in 1861, and his parents Peter and Sarah were pioneer settlers here.  He was a local businessman who married Lottie Belle Huff in Lake City.  They had this 2½-story, brick, Queen Anne house built in 1901.  John W. and Bertha Jacobs bought the house from the Smiths in 1913.  He was a local attorney and politician.  They lived in the house into the mid-1960s. The house was designed by a Racine, Wisconsin architect whose last name was Flagel.  The high degree of integrity makes it significant.  The asymmetrical, cross-gable structure has a prominent porch on the southeast corner.  Between the first and second floors is a beltcourse of rough brick, and there is a bracketed cornice at the roofline.  The house was listed on the National Register of Historic Places in 1990.

References

Houses completed in 1901
Lake City, Iowa
Houses in Calhoun County, Iowa
National Register of Historic Places in Calhoun County, Iowa
Houses on the National Register of Historic Places in Iowa
Queen Anne architecture in Iowa